The 1996 Air Canada Cup was Canada's 18th annual national midget 'AAA' hockey championship, played April 16–21, 1996 at the Kamloops Memorial Arena in Kamloops, British Columbia.  The Gouverneurs de Ste-Foy defeated the Thunder Bay Kings in the championship game to win the gold medal. The host North Kamloops Lions won the bronze medal.  Future National Hockey League players competing in this tournament were Brad Stuart and Simon Gagné.

Teams

Round robin

Standings

Scores

New Liskeard 6 - Dartmouth 6
Ste-Foy 3 - Red Deer 1
Thunder Bay 6 - North Kamloops 3
Ste-Foy 4 - Dartmouth 2
Thunder Bay 6 - New Liskeard 3
North Kamloops 6 - Red Deer 2
Ste-Foy 10 - New Liskeard 2
Red Deer 4 - Dartmouth 4
Thunder Bay 8 - Ste-Foy 5
New Liskeard 3 - North Kamloops 2
Red Deer 4 - Thunder Bay 0
North Kamloops 7 - Ste-Foy 2
Dartmouth 4 - Thunder Bay 2
Red Deer 6 - New Liskeard 2
North Kamloops 9 - Dartmouth 2

Playoffs

Semi-finals
Thunder Bay 6 - Red Deer 2
Ste-Foy 2 - North Kamloops 1

Bronze-medal game
North Kamloops 2 - Red Deer 1

Gold-medal game
Ste-Foy 6 - Thunder Bay 4

Individual awards
Most Valuable Player: Derek Paget (North Kamloops)
Top Scorer: Ken MacPherson (Dartmouth)
Top Forward: Francois Fortier (Ste-Foy)
Top Defenceman: Paul Manning (Red Deer)
Top Goaltender: Joey Stephenson (Red Deer)
Most Sportsmanlike Player: Jesse Pyatt (Thunder Bay)
Air Canada Scholarship: Derek Paget (North Kamloops)
Esso Scholarship: Shawn Hebert (Thunder Bay)

See also
Telus Cup

References

External links
1996 Air Canada Cup Home Page
Hockey Canada-Telus Cup Guide and Record Book

Telus Cup
Air Canada Cup
Sports competitions in Greater Sudbury
April 1996 sports events in Canada